The 2022–23 Perth Scorchers season was the eleventh in the club's history. Coached by Adam Voges and captained by Ashton Turner they competed in the BBL's 2021–22 season.

Standings

Squad information
The current squad of the Perth Scorchers for the 2022–23 Big Bash League season as of 22 February 2022.

Regular season

Play-offs

Matches

References 

Perth Scorchers seasons
2022–23 Australian cricket season